Shatt is an ethnic group in Sudan located in the northern Shatt Hills southwest of Kadugli in South Kordofan State (Shatt Daman, Shatt Safia, Shatt Tebeldia) and in the Abu Hashim and Abu Sinam areas.  They refer to themselves as the Caning people. They are one of seven distinct ethnicities comprising the Daju people. They speak Shatt, a Nilo-Saharan language. Most members of this ethnic group are Muslims. The population of the Shatt exceeds 15,000.

References

External sources 
Gurtong Peace project: "Shatt (Thuri)"
Language Map of Sudan Huffman, Steve

Ethnic groups in Sudan